Llanbedr railway station serves the village of Llanbedr in Gwynedd, Wales. Until 8 May 1978, it was known as Talwrn Bach. The station is an unstaffed halt on the Cambrian Coast Railway with passenger services to Porthmadog, Pwllheli, Barmouth, Machynlleth and Shrewsbury. This station is close to the popular camping resort of Shell Island. Trains call only on request.

From 22 June 2020, trains did not call at the station due to the short platform and the inability to maintain social distancing between passengers and the guard when opening the train door. This meant that, in the Office of Rail and Road's statistics, it became one of Britain's least used stations, recording 0 passengers in the year 2020–21. However, the station has since reopened according to Transport for Wales, the train operator which provides services to and from the station.

References

External links

Railway stations in Gwynedd
DfT Category F2 stations
Former Great Western Railway stations
Railway stations in Great Britain opened in 1923
Railway stations served by Transport for Wales Rail
Railway request stops in Great Britain
Llanbedr